Keiran Breslin is a retired soccer midfielder who played professionally in the North American A-League.

Breslin attended the Florida Institute of Technology where he was part of the 1991 NCAA Division II Men's Soccer Championship.  He finished his bachelor's degree in 1994, but remained at Florida Tech to complete his master's degree in 1996.  While he worked on his degree, Breslin played for the Cocoa Expos in the USISL beginning in 1994.  During the 1995-1996 USISL indoor season, Breslin scored fifteen goals.  In 1996, he moved to the Carolina Dynamo in the A-League where he played two seasons.  He returned to the Dynamo in 1999 for another two seasons.

References

Living people
American Professional Soccer League players
North Carolina Fusion U23 players
Cocoa Expos players
Florida Tech Panthers men's soccer players
USISL players
Association football midfielders
American soccer players
Year of birth missing (living people)